Eustacio Rizo Escoto (born 30 September 1971) is a Mexican former footballer. He played in four matches for the Mexico national football team from 1995 to 1997. He was also part of Mexico's squad for the 1997 Copa América tournament. At the club level, Rizo debuted with Tecos in 1991.

References

External links
 

1971 births
Living people
Mexico international footballers
Association football forwards
Tecos F.C. footballers
Cruz Azul footballers
C.D. Guadalajara footballers
Irapuato F.C. footballers
C.D. Veracruz footballers
Club Puebla players
Liga MX players
Ascenso MX players
Footballers from Jalisco
People from Arandas, Jalisco
Mexican footballers